The Marianne Ihalainen Award an ice hockey trophy seasonally awarded by the Finnish Ice Hockey Association to the regular season top point scorer of the Naisten Liiga, known as the Naisten SM-sarja during 1982 to 2017. It is named after Marianne Ihalainen, former SM-sarja forward and one of the most accomplished women in the history of Finnish ice hockey.

Award winners 

Source: Elite Prospects

All time award recipients

References

Naisten Liiga (ice hockey) trophies and awards